Cumberland United FC is an Australian association football club based in Adelaide, South Australia. Cumberland competes in the National Premier League South Australia, the second-tier of Australian soccer under the top-flight, A-League. Their home ground is AA Bailey Reserve in the inner southern suburb of Clarence Gardens, adjacent to Cumberland Park.

History

Cumberland United is one of the oldest soccer clubs in South Australia. The club first appeared in 1941 fielding junior teams in the local intermediate league. Their first league game in the intermediate league was against South Adelaide on Saturday 10 May 1941. The result was a 9–0 victory for Cumberland.

Cumberland's first senior game was on Saturday 8 May 1943 against the now defunct Perry Engineering Works. The final score was a 9–0 win for Cumberland.  Dunbar, for Cumberland, found the net six times, Ingham scored twice and Edwards once. The game was played as a home game for Cumberland at Hollywood Estate, a then adjacent suburb.

Since 1943 the club has won the championship twice and the Federation Cup once.

Junior Football has gone from strength to strength while being one of the strongest teams in many junior age groups. The Club established a more focused junior program in 1990 which has continued to grow since then, with 17 teams currently playing at Bailey Reserve. Many of the present senior players began their Club Football at Cumberland. This has been one of the key objectives of the program now coming to fruition.

Current squad

Club honours
State League Champions 2016
State League Premiers 2016
1st Division Champions: 1978 & 1999
2nd Division Champions: 1984, 1986, 1997, 2003 & 2016
Federation Cup Winners: 1978, 2009
Premier League top 5 Champions: 2009

External links
 Official Website

National Premier Leagues clubs
Soccer clubs in South Australia
Association football clubs established in 1943
1943 establishments in Australia